Pavel Kotraba (born 3 November 1970) is a Slovak biathlete. He competed in the men's sprint event at the 1994 Winter Olympics.

References

1970 births
Living people
Slovak male biathletes
Olympic biathletes of Slovakia
Biathletes at the 1994 Winter Olympics
People from Teplice